The Philadelphia Spirit was a United States Basketball League team that played from 1991 to 1992 at Holy Family University in Northeast Philadelphia.

In 1991, they finished first in the league, with a 15–5 record. They beat the Miami Tropics in the league's finals, winning the championship. The team was coached by Bill Lange, a New Jersey high school coach, who was named USBL Coach of the Year. In 1992, they again finished first in the league, with a 21–5 record. They played in that year's league finals as well. However, they lost by two points  to archrival, the Miami Tropics. They disbanded following that season.

Notable players are Michael Anderson, Tim Legler and Marques Bragg.

References

United States Basketball League teams
Defunct basketball teams in Pennsylvania